The 1935 Women's Western Open was a golf competition held at Sunset Ridge Country Club, the 6th edition of the event. Opal Hill won the championship in match play competition by defeating Mrs. S.L. Reinhart in the final match, 9 and 7.

Women's Western Open
Golf in Illinois
Women's Western Open
Women's Western Open
Women's Western Open
Women's sports in Illinois